Christian Streile (27 November 1838 - 4 December 1886) was a private in the United States Army who was awarded the Medal of Honor for gallantry during the American Civil War. He was awarded the medal on 3 May 1865 for actions performed during the Battle of Sailor's Creek in Virginia.

Personal life 
Streile was born on 27 November 1838 in Landkreis Heilbronn, Kingdom of Württemberg (state of Baden-Württemberg in modern day Germany). He married Catherine Streile. He died on 4 December 1886 in New York and is buried in All Faiths Cemetery in Middle Village, New York.

Military service 
Streile was mustered into service with Company I, 1st New Jersey Cavalry on 15 February 1864. He earned the Medal of Honor on 5 April 1865 at the Battle of Sailor's Creek in Virginia for capturing an unspecified enemy flag. He was mustered out of service on 24 July 1865.

References 

1838 births
1886 deaths
German emigrants to the United States
Military personnel from Baden-Württemberg
American Civil War recipients of the Medal of Honor
United States Army Medal of Honor recipients
German-born Medal of Honor recipients